Pincus Green (born 1934) is an American oil and gas commodities trader. In 1983 Green and his business partner Marc Rich were indicted on charges of tax evasion relating to illegal trading with Iran.  However in 2001 Green and Rich received a presidential pardon from president Bill Clinton.

Early life 
Green was born to an Orthodox Jewish family, the seventh of eight children, and raised in Flatbush, Brooklyn. His father was a distributor of confectionery. As a youth, Green attended Jewish parochial schools but dropped out of high school to support his family when he was 16.

Career 
In 1953, at the age of 17, he got a job working the mailroom at the commodity trading firm, Philipp Brothers.  In 1954, Philipps hired Marc Rich in the mailroom and they soon became friends. Both quickly advanced in the company and eventually became top traders in Europe especially in oil trading, Rich in Spain and Green in the Phillips' office in Zug. In 1974, they left Philipp Brothers to form their own company, Marc Rich AG, headquartered in Zug, Switzerland.

Indictment and pardon 
Green along with his partner Marc Rich, were indicted by U.S. Attorney and future mayor of New York City Rudolph Giuliani, on charges of tax evasion and illegal trading with Iran. Then they sold the U.S. affiliate of Marc Rich AG (renamed Clarendon Ltd) to Alec Hackel, a partner to Green and Rich. U.S. legal authorities determined that the sale was false and froze the assets of the company, which hurt Marc Rich AG's .  In 1984, Clarendon paid the U.S. government $150 million to settle tax charges and Marc Rich AG's trading volume recovered. The three partners divided their responsibilities with Rich trading oil, Hackel trading metals and minerals, and Green responsible for shipping, finance, and administration.

Green received a presidential pardon along with Rich, from United States President Bill Clinton in 2001. It has been reported that Green has been in retirement since he underwent heart surgery in late 1990.

In 2005, his net worth was estimated by Forbes magazine at US$1.2 billion.

See also

 List of people pardoned or granted clemency by the president of the United States

Other reading

References

1936 births
Living people
American billionaires
American financiers
American people convicted of tax crimes
American white-collar criminals
Clinton administration controversies
American commodities traders
20th-century American Jews
Fugitive financiers
Recipients of American presidential pardons
20th-century American businesspeople
21st-century American Jews